Ingrid Fernanda Enríquez Guillén (born February 4, 2000), known professionally as Ingratax, is a Mexican singer and internet celebrity. She released her debut single "París" in July 2021, and launched her debut studio album "KITSUNE" in November 2022.

Early life and career 
Ingrid Fernanda Enríquez Guillén was born on February 4, 2000, in Chihuahua, Mexico. When she was five years old, her grandmother Yolanda began teaching her guitar and piano.

Enríquez joined TikTok in 2019 and often posts duets. She has 15.2 million followers. She is a member of the Team Cheli house. Enríquez released her debut single, "París," in early-July 2021. Billboard described the sad pop track as melancholic. The melody was written by Resko Fozia after engaging in a relationship with the latter. Enríquez was nominated at the 2021 MTV Millennial Awards in the favorite new school category. Ingratax is signed to Sergio Lizárraga's indie label, Room 28. In mid-July 2021, "París" went viral on TikTok and charted 36 on Hot Latin Songs, 37 on Billboard Global Excl. U.S. and 63 on Billboard Global 200. The music video has over 50 million views on YouTube.

Discography

References 

Living people
2000 births
People from Mazatlán
Singers from Chihuahua (state)
21st-century Mexican women singers
Mexican TikTokers
Mexican women pop singers
Women in Latin music